National Publishing Company is a historic book publisher in the United States. It was established in Philadelphia, Pennsylvania, by Joshua R. Jones. In 1878 the business had a five-storey building constructed for its headquarters at 726 Cherry Street in Philadelphia. The publisher produced bibles, books of maps, encyclopedias and other books. It expanded with offices opening up in Chicago, St. Louis and Australia.

Attorney Charles A. Hawkins was Jones' nephew and helped the Jones family publishing empire expand.

References

Defunct book publishing companies of the United States
Companies based in Philadelphia